Singleton railway station is a heritage-listed railway station located on the Main Northern line in New South Wales, Australia. It serves the town of Singleton. It was added to the New South Wales State Heritage Register on 2 April 1999.

History

The station opened on 7 May 1863.

The original, listed 1863 John Whitton brick station building remains. It opened as the terminus of the Great Northern Railway when it was extended from Branxton. In 1869, Singleton lost its terminus status when the line was extended north to Muswellbrook. It had a freight yard including locomotive servicing facilities. The line from Whittingham was duplicated in 1951.

Singleton was the stabling point for the last regular steam locomotive passenger service in Australia, a peak hour service to Newcastle that ceased in July 1971.

Platforms & services
Singleton has one platform. It is serviced by NSW TrainLink Hunter Line services travelling between Newcastle and Muswellbrook/Scone.

For a number of years in the 1980s, the passenger services were replaced by road coaches while the line was upgraded. Rail services were restored on 14 March 1988.

It is also served by NSW TrainLink Xplorer services from Sydney to Armidale and Moree.

Transport links
Hunter Valley Buses operate five routes via Singleton station:
180: Stockland Green Hills to Singleton Heights via Maitland
180x: Maitland station express
401: Singleton Town Circuit
403: to Hunterview
404: to Singleton Heights

Description 

The station complex consists of the second-class brick station buildings (1863) and pre-cast concrete type K signal box (1926). The platforms are brick, with early use of ramped beds, and pre-cast concrete at the north end. A jib crane also remains within the station precinct.

Heritage listing 
Singleton is significant as the oldest surviving station building in the Hunter Valley fronting a major civic square in the town, displaying fine brickwork and detailing. The scale of the building is large in comparison to the buildings of similar period in the area. The awning is a later addition  1910. The pre-cast concrete signal box being a late addition is typical of its time and came due to upgrading of signalling.

Singleton railway station was listed on the New South Wales State Heritage Register on 2 April 1999.

References

Attribution

External links

Singleton station details Transport for New South Wales

Easy Access railway stations in New South Wales
John Whitton railway stations
Railway stations in the Hunter Region
Railway stations in Australia opened in 1863
Regional railway stations in New South Wales
New South Wales State Heritage Register
Singleton, New South Wales
Main North railway line, New South Wales